Louis Chéron (2 September 1660 – 26 May 1725) was a French painter, illustrator and art tutor.

Life
Chéron was born in Paris, into a French Protestant family of artists (his father being the miniaturist and engraver Henri Chéron and his elder sister the painter and engraver Elizabeth-Sophie Chéron). He trained under his father then at the Académie Royale de Peinture et de Sculpture. 
On the trips to Rome occasioned by his first winning of the Académie's prix de Rome in 1676 (he won again in 1678), he studied Raphael and Giulio Romano. 

He returned to France, winning several commissions but in the wake of the persecutions after the edict of Nantes's revocation in 1685 he decided to leave France (possibly encouraged by Ralph Montagu, later one of his patrons), showing up in the registers of the Huguenot congregation at the Savoy Chapel in London in 1693. 
He was made a naturalised Briton in 1710, worked on Montague House (1706–12), Burghley House and Chatsworth House and was one of five artists who submitted drawings for St Paul's Cathedral's dome.
He also produced engraved images with James Thornhill.

In 1718, Chéron and John Vanderbank split from Godfrey Kneller's Great Queen Street Academy (where they were both teaching) to form their own St. Martin's Lane Academy. 
Chéron died in London in 1725 and was buried at St Paul's, Covent Garden.

References

Attribution

Sources

Further reading
 
 
 
 

17th-century French painters
French male painters
18th-century French painters
Huguenots
1660 births
1725 deaths
18th-century French male artists